Philo Paz Patric Armand (born 12 March 1996) is an Indonesian former racing driver.

Career

Karting
Born in Jakarta, Armand began karting in 2006, winning the Formula Cadet class of the Indonesian Karting Championship the following year. In 2009, he won the Junior class of the Indonesian Karting Championship and finished 13th in the Asia-Pacific KF3 Championship. In 2011, he finished 4th in the Asia-Pacific KF1 Championship, and during the year he also became an official driver of the Tony Kart Racing Team.

During his final year of karting in 2012, Armand finished 14th in the CIK-FIA KF1 Karting World Championship, a title won by teammate Flavio Camponeschi.

Formula Renault 2.0
After making his single-seater debut in the Formula Renault BARC Winter Series in late 2012, Armand joined Fortec Motorsports to contest the 2013 Formula Renault 2.0 NEC season. He finished 28th in the championship, with a best race result of eleventh coming in the final round in Zandvoort. He also contested four races of the Formula Renault 2.0 Alps championship as a guest driver with Tech 1 Racing.

Armand switched to Formula Renault 2.0 Alps for a full-time campaign with Tech 1 Racing for the 2014 season. He finished 18th in the championship, with a best race result of fourth coming at the second round in Pau. He also took part in two rounds of the Eurocup Formula Renault 2.0 season with the team.

Formula Renault 3.5 Series
In 2015, Armand graduated to the Formula Renault 3.5 Series, racing alongside Roberto Merhi at Pons Racing.

GP2 Series
He joined Trident Racing for the 2016 GP2 Series.

Racing record

Career summary

† As Armand was a guest driver, he was ineligible for championship points.

Complete Formula Renault 3.5 Series results
(key) (Races in bold indicate pole position) (Races in italics indicate fastest lap)

Complete GP2 Series results
(key) (Races in bold indicate pole position) (Races in italics indicate fastest lap)

References

External links

 

1996 births
Living people
Indonesian Christians
Sportspeople from Jakarta
Indonesian racing drivers
Moluccan people
Formula Renault 2.0 Alps drivers
Formula Renault Eurocup drivers
Formula Renault 2.0 NEC drivers
Formula Renault BARC drivers
Karting World Championship drivers
World Series Formula V8 3.5 drivers
GP2 Series drivers
Pons Racing drivers
Tech 1 Racing drivers
Trident Racing drivers
Fortec Motorsport drivers
21st-century Indonesian people